The Whitehouse Independent School District is a school district in Whitehouse, Texas, United States. In addition to Whitehouse, the district also serves some of the southeast Tyler.

In 2009, the school district was rated "academically acceptable" by the Texas Education Agency.

In 2021, a survey conducted by students revealed the Whitehouse High School was "just alright".

School campuses
Whitehouse High School (grades 9-12)
Whitehouse Junior High (grades 7-8)
J.W. Holloway Middle (grade 6)
H.L. Higgins Elementary (grades preK-5)
Mozelle Brown Elementary (grade preK-5)
Stanton-Smith Elementary (grades preK-5)
Gus Winston Cain Elementary (grades preK-5)

Extracurricular programs
Extracurricular programs include high class concert and marching band, a choir program, a theater arts company, art classes, Spanish (from 7th grade), and athletics. Whitehouse's marching band is known as "The Best Marching Band in East Texas" because of the extravagant performances they put on during hometown football games and their role in the Tyler Rose Parade, Christmas parade, and other area celebrations. Onlookers often mistake the Whitehouse Junior High Band for a high school marching band because of their skill and prestige. Likewise, the Whitehouse High School Band could be mistaken for a College level band. Not only for their musicianship, but their sheer size, which is roughly 270 members strong. This has left the residents of Whitehouse and the surrounding cities eager to view their next performances. The District also is known for its outstanding athletic program, in which, On November 8, the high school football team became undefeated in regular season play, beating John Tyler High School, led by Kansas City Chiefs quarterback Patrick Mahomes. Additionally, the baseball program has reached the UIL State Baseball Tournament twice (2013, 2006, and 2016)

Officials
The district is led by Dr. Christopher Moran, superintendent of schools. The WISD school board is led by Greg Hood, president; Wade Weathers, vice president; and Holly Conaway, secretary.

Principals
Whitehouse High School: Joshua Garred
Whitehouse Junior High School: William Ripley 
Holloway Middle School: 
Stanton-Smith Elementary School: Curtis Williams
Higgins Elementary School: Tom Luce
Brown Elementary School: Valencia Ray
Cain Elementary School: Laurie Blain

References

External links
Official site

School districts in Smith County, Texas
Education in Tyler, Texas